Pim Rietbroek (born 2 April 1942) is a Dutch retired handball player. As a player, he collected one cap for the  Netherlands men's national handball team. After his playing career, he was active as a coach at various clubs and was national coach of the Dutch men's team.

Career
As a player, he played mostly for Vlug en Lenig in the 1970s.

In 1997 he became player and coach of Vlug en Lenig, coaching it until 1975. He returned in 1976 an coached it until 1985, when he decided to take a respite from coaching. In this period he won three national titles and one Dutch cup with Vlug en Lenig. In 1999 Rietbroek became coach of Eynatten. During his time with the Belgian club he won the national title in 2000, 2001 and 2002 and the cup in 2000. In 2003 he left Eynatten to become again coach of V&L, coaching it until 2005. He then became coach of the Netherlands men's national handball team together with Harry Weerman. He coached the national team until 2007 because due to financial reasons at the NHV, he could no longer continue as national coach.

References

Dutch handball coaches
1942 births
Living people
People from Geleen
Dutch male handball players
Sportspeople from Limburg (Netherlands)
Dutch expatriate sportspeople in Belgium